Katherine Joan Greer (April 3, 1927 – May 24, 2001), known professionally as Jo Ann Greer, was an American singer.

Career 
Her career spanned nearly 50 years, and she primarily worked in the fields of movie dubbing and band-singing.  She initially became known to Hollywood casting people from an early marriage to pianist Freddie Slack in the 1940s and later through her long employment with Les Brown and his Band of Renown.  Following some early appearances with Sonny Burke and his orchestra, Greer recorded for Decca Records and joined  Ray Anthony's band, with whom she scored her two biggest hits, "Wild Horses" (No. 28 in Billboard) and "The Hokey Pokey" in 1953. After four unhappy months, she replaced Lucy Ann Polk as vocalist with Les Brown's band in May 1953.  They made numerous singles for Coral Records and later Capitol Records and toured internationally for nearly 40 years, well into the early 1990s.  She won the 1956 Down Beat Readers Poll for "best girl band vocalist." Greer became increasingly associated with her distinctive version of Brown's hit song "Sentimental Journey", which he had originally recorded with Doris Day.  

Her other career was as a secret "ghost" singer for famous movie stars.  In 1952, Rita Hayworth had returned to Hollywood following the break-up of her marriage to Prince Aly Khan and began work on her "comeback" film, Affair in Trinidad.  After several failed attempts to let Hayworth try to do her own singing, musical director Morris Stoloff brought in Greer, who was deemed a good vocal match and even had a slight lisp similar to Hayworth's.  Greer's vocals on "Trinidad Lady" and "I've Been Kissed Before" helped the movie become a big box-office hit, even out-grossing Gilda by more than a million dollars.

Greer continued to be in big demand as a dubber, especially at Columbia Pictures, and went on to do the vocal tracks for such stars as Gloria Grahame (in Naked Alibi), Kim Novak (in 5 Against the House), May Wynn (in The Caine Mutiny), Esther Williams (in Jupiter's Darling), June Allyson (in The Opposite Sex), and Susan Kohner (in Imitation of Life).  Other dubbing work at Columbia included the Dan Dailey-starrer Meet Me at the Fair (for Carole Mathews) and Frankie Laine's Rainbow 'Round My Shoulder (for Charlotte Austin, daughter of entertainer/songwriter Gene Austin).

She also sang for Hayworth in two more of her biggest successes, Miss Sadie Thompson and Pal Joey. When the latter two soundtrack albums were released by Mercury Records and Capitol Records respectively, however, Greer's name was not even listed, in order to preserve the illusion that it was Hayworth who sang. Greer and Hayworth enjoyed a good working relationship on all three of the films they did together.  Hayworth would attend Greer's recording sessions and dance barefoot for her in front of the microphone so that Greer could follow her breathing and movements as she sang.

Stoloff also utilized Greer's talents for two projects on the newly formed Colpix Records label, having her record "My Funny Valentine" (he supposedly had never liked the version done by another singer for Kim Novak in Pal Joey), and Hayworth's signature song "Put the Blame on Mame" for the album Voices, Soundtracks and Themes From Great Movies (Greer's name was once more left off both the label and the jacket).  The second Colpix album was more ambitious, an original film noir-style musical entitled The Naked City, named to tie in with the popular film and TV series, with music by George Duning, text and lyrics by Ned Washington and narration by veteran actor John McIntire.  The singing was done by Greer, James Darren, and the Jud Conlon Singers.  This time their names were listed in tiny print on the record label, but left off of the LP cover.  It was released in stereo as Colpix SCP 505.

Greer never got to record a vocal album of her own, but some of her many singles have been reissued on CD, most of her films are available on DVD and many CD collections have been released of her broadcasts and live performances with the bands of Anthony, Burke and Brown, including shows from the Hollywood Palladium, Denver's Elitch Gardens and the 1983 Aurex Jazz Festival in Tokyo, Japan.  She also made one on-screen appearance as herself in the 1957 Universal-International musical short Dance Demons, in which she sings "Moonlight in Vermont" with the Les Brown band.

In 1991, while still performing occasionally with the Brown band (now mostly led by Les, Jr.), she was part of a successful cabaret show called Voices, which also featured two other prominent "ghost" singers, Annette Warren and India Adams.  They were invited to perform at one of that year's Oscar events by the Motion Picture Academy.

A CD compilation of her work was produced by her last manager Alan Eichler and released in 2012 by Jasmine Records.

Personal life 
Greer's second mariage was to Stan Stout, a trumpet player with the Les Brown orchestra, and following their divorce she married another trumpet player, Mickey McMahan. She also appeared with him on three episodes of the Lawrence Welk Show in 1966 and 1967, on which he had become a regular.  She had three children, Bryan, Jayme and Patrick.

Greer died in 2001, following a long bout with Alzheimer's.

References 

N.Y. Times, IMDB

External links 
 

American jazz singers
Big band singers
Colpix Records artists
1927 births
2001 deaths
20th-century American singers
20th-century American women singers